Stanley Conner is an American college football coach and former professional player. He served as the head football coach at Benedict College in Columbia, South Carolina from 2007 until midway through the 2011 season and Concordia College Alabama in Selma, Alabama from 2014 to 2015. Concordia program was forced to shut down to budget cuts after the 2015 season.

Head coaching record

College

Notes

References

External links
 Miles profile

Year of birth missing (living people)
Living people
Alabama A&M Bulldogs football coaches
Alabama State Hornets football coaches
Benedict Tigers football coaches
Boston/New Orleans/Portland Breakers players
Concordia College (Alabama) Hornets football coaches
Jackson State Tigers football players
Miles Golden Bears football coaches
High school football coaches in Alabama
African-American coaches of American football
African-American players of American football
20th-century African-American sportspeople
21st-century African-American sportspeople